The international conference on supporting Palestine Intifada is regarded as an international conference which is held in Iran in opportune times. As its main goal, the Islamic Republic of Iran is following different ways to support Palestinians to reach their rights. There are diverse authorities and political activists from different countries of the world who participate in the meeting.

Background

The Iranian Parliament passed a law as “Supporting Islamic Revolution Of Palestine” in 1990. According to this law, the Islamic Republic of Iran supports oppressed people of Palestine; as well as this, it assigns a task for the boards of the directors of Iranian Parliament to extend its support (in different ways) for Palestinians and to hold conference(s) till Palestinians regain their rights.

The conference 1991–2017
The international conference on supporting Palestine Intifada is continued in opportune times. So far, the conference has been held six times. The first meeting started in October 1991. Then, it held in 2001, 2006, 2009, 2011 and eventually the six meeting as the last conference till now held in February 2017.

Membership

There are diverse authorities/political activists from different countries who participate in the conference. For instance, there were 700 prominent guests from 80 countries of the world who participated in the sixth conference, including Iranian high-ranking officials (e.g., the Supreme leader of Iran as the highest-ranking authority in Iran –Ayatollah Khamenei_ ,  President Rouhani, the speaker of the Parliament of Iran Ali Larijani, and many other famous authorities from different countries, among:

 Hadiya Khalaf Abbas, the speaker of People's Council of Syria,
 Sami Abu Zuhri, a senior spokesman for the Palestinian organization Hamas.
 Nabih Berri, the speaker of the Parliament of Lebanon.
 Amin Molia, the speaker of the Parliament of Malaysia.
 Ramadan Shalah, the chief of Islamic Jihad Movement in Palestine.
 Naim Qassem, the second in command of Hezbollah with the title of deputy secretary-general.
 Khalid al Ma'awali, the speaker of the Parliament of Oman.

And many other prominent authorities.

Final statement

The participants in the sixth conference, emphasized on the necessity of further attempt to terminate the occupying Palestine and to be pursued for the unity in Palestine lands, and forming the independent country of Palestine, and al-Quds to be its capital. Meanwhile, this statement rejected the normalization of relationship to Zionism Regime, and asked all countries to break off their relationship to this regime, besides, this statement announced a few other issues, too.

References

Resistance movements
1991 establishments in Iran